Queen's Road, Brighton is a major street in Brighton, East Sussex. It was rebuilt during an 1845 slum clearance programme to connect Brighton railway station to the town centre. It is part of the A2010 road, and connects the station to the Jubilee Clock Tower where it meets Western Road, West Street and North Street.

History

In 1822 there were 25 buildings where the street was built. Part of the land had been a burial ground since the 1700s. When Queen's Road was built, it formed the new boundary to the burial ground of Hanover Chapel. Previously Windsor Terrace had run along the west side of Queen's Road, having been built in 1830. The raised pavement and iron railings running between North Road and Church Street date back to this period and have Grade II listed building status. Queen's Road soon became known as the location for a number of hospitals and health facilities. For example, No. 27, a Terrace house dating from c.1830 was once the home of a dental hospital.

References

Brighton
Streets in England